Akchii may refer to:

 Akchikarasu, a village in the Jalal-Abad Province of Kyrgyzstan
 Akchi, Pavlodar Province, Kazakhstan